Don Wilkerson (c. 1932 – 18 July 1986) was an American soul jazz / R&B tenor saxophonist born in Moreauville, Louisiana, probably better known for his Blue Note Records recordings in the 1960s as bandleader with guitarist Grant Green. Prior to signing with the label, he worked frequently with Cannonball Adderley. Some of his earliest recordings were done in the 1950s as a sideman for Amos Milburn and Ray Charles.

In Houston in the early 1970s, he played in the Sonny Franklin Big Band with Tom Archia, Arnett Cobb, and his bandmate from the Ray Charles band, Joe Bridgewater, with guest appearances by Eddie "Cleanhead" Vinson and Clarence "Gatemouth" Brown.  Many of the band's arrangements were done by Cedric Haywood.

Discography

As leader
 The Texas Twister (Riverside, 1960)
 Preach Brother! (Blue Note, 1962)
 Shoutin' (Blue Note, 1963)
 Elder Don (Blue Note, 1963)

As sideman
With Ray Charles
 Yes Indeed! (Atlantic, 1958)
 Modern Sounds in Country and Western Music (ABC-Paramount, 1962)
 Berlin 1962 (Pablo, 1996)

With others
 B.B. King, Blues 'n' Jazz (MCA, 1983)
 Amos Milburn, Chicken Shack Boogie (United Artists, 1978)

References

1932 births
1986 deaths
American jazz tenor saxophonists
American male saxophonists
Soul-jazz saxophonists
Hard bop saxophonists
Blue Note Records artists
20th-century American saxophonists
20th-century American male musicians
American male jazz musicians